Kneria ruaha is a freshwater species of fish in the genus Kneria endemic to Tanzania.  It naturally lives in rivers.

References

Kneria
Endemic fauna of Tanzania
Freshwater fish of Tanzania
Taxonomy articles created by Polbot
Fish described in 1995
Taxa named by Lothar Seegers